The R484 road is a regional road in Ireland which links the R483 road near Creagh with the N68 road in County Clare.

The road passes through a number of villages, including Creagh, and Cooraclare.

See also 

 Roads in Ireland
 National primary road
 National secondary road

References 

Regional roads in the Republic of Ireland
Roads in County Clare